Alexander James Wells (born 27 February 1997) is an Australian professional baseball pitcher who is a free agent.

Professional career
Wells signed with the Baltimore Orioles organization as an international free agent on August 29, 2015. He made his professional debut in 2016 with the Low-A Aberdeen IronBirds, and spent the whole season there, posting a 4–5 record, 2.15 ERA, and a 0.91 WHIP. He spent 2017 with the Single-A Delmarva Shorebirds, pitching to an 11–5 record with a 2.38 ERA in 25 games started.

Wells spent the 2018 season with the High-A Frederick Keys, going 7–8 with a 3.47 ERA in 135 innings. He opened the 2019 season with the Double-A Bowie Baysox, and spent the season with the team, logging a 8-6 record and 2.95 ERA in 24 appearances. He played in the Arizona Fall League for the Surprise Saguaros following the 2019 season.

Wells did not play in a game in 2020 due to the cancellation of the minor league season because of the COVID-19 pandemic. On November 20, 2020, Wells was added to the Orioles' 40-man roster. He was assigned to the Triple-A Norfolk Tides to begin the 2021 season, where he posted a 5.63 ERA in 8 appearances.

On June 25, 2021, Wells was promoted to the major leagues for the first time. He made his MLB debut the following day, pitching in relief against the Houston Astros. Wells collected his first major league win against the Astros in Baltimore's 13–3 win on June 29. Wells was optioned back to Norfolk following the game.

Wells began the 2022 season with Baltimore and was optioned to Norfolk on April 17. On May 1, it was announced that Wells would miss 8-12 weeks after suffering a Grade 1 UCL strain. He elected free agency on November 10, 2022.

International career
Wells was on Australia's roster for the 2017 World Baseball Classic.

Personal life
His twin, Lachlan Wells, pitched in the Minnesota Twins organization.

References

External links

1997 births
Living people
Aberdeen IronBirds players
Australian expatriate baseball players in the United States
Baltimore Orioles players
Bowie Baysox players
Delmarva Shorebirds players
Frederick Keys players
Major League Baseball pitchers
Major League Baseball players from Australia
Norfolk Tides players
Sportspeople from Newcastle, New South Wales
Surprise Saguaros players
Australian twins
Twin sportspeople
2017 World Baseball Classic players